IodaRacing Project is an Italian motorcycle constructor and racing team based in Terni, Italy. The team currently fields Aprilia motorcycles in the Superbike World Championship with Leandro Mercado and with Yamaha motorcycles in the Supersport 300 World Championship with Armando Pontone. Between 2011 and 2015 IodaRacing raced in the Grand Prix World Championship, making appearances in all three classes using different chassis.

History

Background
Team principal Giampiero Sacchi had been involved in the sport since the 1980s when he was working in management and public relations. Sacchi ran his own team, Scuderia Carrizosa, from 1996 to 1998 in the 125cc and 250cc classes before working for Derbi Racing, Gilera and Aprilia between 1998 and 2010. Sacchi was also responsible for overseeing the careers of several champions including Valentino Rossi and Jorge Lorenzo. Sacchi launched IodaRacing Project in 2010 with intentions to enter Grand Prix motorcycle racing in 2011.

MotoGP
IodaRacing entered the MotoGP class under Claiming Rule Teams (CRT) regulations in 2012. The team used its own chassis, the TR003, with an Aprilia RSV4 engine. Danilo Petrucci was the team's rider for the season. Petrucci recorded seven points-scoring finishes across the eighteen races to finish nineteenth in the championship, with a best finish of eighth at the final round. The team switched to Suter frames and BMW engines midway through the season.

IodaRacing continued to use Suter-BMW machinery in 2013. The team expanded to run two bikes, one for Petrucci and one for Czech rider Lukáš Pešek.

In  and  IodaRacing switched to ART bikes.

Moto2
IodaRacing first competed in Grand Prix motorcycle racing in 2011 in the Moto2 class. Simone Corsi and Mattia Pasini rode for the team, with FTR chassis being used. Corsi scored two podiums during the course of the season to finish sixth in the championship, with Pasini finishing in twenty-fourth. The team continued to use the FTR chassis in 2012, downsizing to one bike for Corsi. Corsi was unable to replicate the podium results of 2011, ending the season eleventh in the points with a best finish of fifth.

For 2013, IodaRacing switched to using a Suter chassis as it had done in the MotoGP class during the second half of 2012. With Corsi moving to NGM Mobile Racing, the team employed the 2011 125cc-class runner-up Johann Zarco. In 2014, Randy Krummenacher joined the team. His best result was 7th at the Sachsenring. In 2015, Florian Alt was the team's rider. Alt failed to score points, as his best result was 19th at Indianapolis.

Moto3
IodaRacing competed in the 2012 Moto3 season using the Ioda TR002. Luigi Morciano and Jonas Folger began the season riding for the team, with Folger recording a best result of eleventh in France. However, this would prove to be the team's only points-scoring finish during the season. Folger left the team before the Indianapolis round, replaced by Armando Pontone. The team finished eighth in the Manufacturers' championship with 5 points.

Models
IodaRacing Project has produced the following motorcycles for use in Grand Prix racing:

MotoGP
 TR003

Moto3
 TR001 (prototype)
 TR002
 TR004

Results

MotoGP results
(key)

References

External links
 

Superbike racing
Motorcycle racing teams
Motorcycle racing teams established in 2010
2010 establishments in Italy
Motorcycle racing teams disestablished in 2017
2017 disestablishments in Italy